Qapanlı (also, Kapanly, known as Məmmədalılar until 1994) is a village and municipality in the Shamkir Rayon of Azerbaijan.  It has a population of 2,749.

References 

Populated places in Shamkir District